Rolf Herings (10 July 1940 – 29 September 2017) was a German javelin thrower who competed in the 1964 Summer Olympics and in the 1968 Summer Olympics and football coach (1.FC Köln).

References

1940 births
2017 deaths
German male javelin throwers
Olympic athletes of the United Team of Germany
Olympic athletes of West Germany
Athletes (track and field) at the 1964 Summer Olympics
Athletes (track and field) at the 1968 Summer Olympics
Universiade medalists in athletics (track and field)
Universiade gold medalists for West Germany
1. FC Köln managers
Medalists at the 1961 Summer Universiade
Medalists at the 1965 Summer Universiade
German football managers
20th-century German people